A press pass (alternatively referred to as a press card or a journalist pass) grants some type of special privilege to journalists.  Some cards have recognized legal status; others merely indicate that the bearer is a practicing journalist.  The nature of the benefits is determined by the type of issuing agency, of which there are three major categories: news organizations, law-enforcement agencies, and event organizers (usually for a specific single affair like a corporate press conference).  Each type of card grants different authorizations, thus it is often necessary or desirable for reporters to hold multiple press passes simultaneously.

Law-enforcement cards

Police departments at a city, county, or state/provincial level may issue press passes in some countries.  Such passes allow the bearer to cross police or fire lines to report breaking news, or grant access to crime scenes or other restricted areas– though admission may be denied if it would interfere with the duties of emergency personnel. Popular media of the mid-20th century often depicted reporters at a crime scene with their press passes tucked into their hat bands, which was unusual in reality.

Because of the exceptional dispensation endowed by police press passes, they are issued with discretion–some jurisdictions require an in-person interview with all prospective applicants, complete set of fingerprints, and a background check.  Generally, only reporters who cover breaking news are eligible; other journalists (feature writers, editors and editorialists, freelance writers, and bloggers) are not.

Police-issued passes do not grant access to government press conferences or any other such privileges: they are only recognized by emergency response personnel, and only valid within the jurisdiction of the issuing agencies.

Parking permits
Police parking permits, issued in some jurisdictions, exempt news vehicles from certain parking restrictions while on the job.  They may be offered to any news-gathering organization that covers breaking news for use in company vehicles employed by full-time reporters, photographers, and camera operators. Often, these permits are only granted to journalists who already carry a police press card.

When conspicuously displayed, these permits may allow the bearer to park in restricted "resident-only" parking zones, and may exempt him or her from parking-meter costs. These privileges apply only for the duration of breaking-news coverage, and do not nullify all parking restrictions: red zones, fire hydrants, crosswalks, bus zones, disabled parking zones or access ramps, commercial loading zones, taxi cab zones, "no stopping" or "no parking" zones, transit lanes, and other towaway zones are still off-limits.

Event-specific

For tradeshows, community gatherings, sporting events, award shows, professional conferences, or major events of any type, press passes are generally available.  These are sometimes referred to as "press badges". For many events publicity in news media and elsewhere is of great importance, and granting privileges to the press can help in this. The privileges granted to holders of press badges, and who is eligible to receive them, depends on the nature of the affair.

Generally, prospective recipients must apply in advance, offering evidence of their affiliation.  Event sponsors may request past published material, or a letter from the news agency on its letterhead, detailing the job assignment. Generally, non-reporting employees of news agencies (executives, sales personnel, publishers, editors, etc.) are not eligible for press passes. In addition to journalists, some bloggers may be granted event passes.

Many major events, especially trade shows, issue press kits to pass-holders. A press pass may allow the bearer to request interviews with noteworthy attendees, and special rooms are sometimes set aside for this purpose.

Open events

For activities open to the public, such as community gatherings, school events, or trade shows, a police- or media-issued press pass may offer little advantage. Free or reduced-price admission, or guaranteed entry, can sometimes be arranged. The benefits may be more extensive, granting access to front-row seats or to press-only rooms. For sporting events, a press pass issued by a stadium grants access to the press box. Because open events are usually funded by paying attendees, the number of press passes may depend on the number of tickets sold.

Closed events
For events closed to the general public, police- or news organization-issued press passes sometimes grant access, but almost all require advance application for admittance.  Greater exclusivity, however, means more restrictions on potential pass recipients.  For professional conferences or trade shows, passes may be granted only to journalists who regularly cover the industry or who hold a title of "industry analyst", or with an editorial or reporting designation.

News agency cards

"You do not need to ask permission from anyone to be a journalist," explains the Periodical Publishers Association; "however, it is sometimes useful to be able to identify yourself as a journalist when needed."
To this end, journalistic agencies issue press cards to their reporters, editorialists, writers, and photographers.  These do not have the legal merits of government-issued cards, and they will not replace event-specific passes; the card only serves as proof of its bearer's status as a legitimate newsperson according to the issuing organization.  As such, card-carriers may be better able to obtain interviews, acquire information from law-enforcement, or gain access to exclusive venues.

In the United Kingdom, the UK Press Card Authority (a voluntary consortium of news agencies) issues a nationally standardized card to United Kingdom-based news gatherers.

In most other European countries, cards are issued by national trade unions of journalists. Some require membership or government approval.

For freelance journalists, organizations like the National Writers Union, Professional Publishers Association Creative News Service(CNS) from ICC national Union of Journalists (UK) or US Press Association issue cards.

The UK Press Card Authority 

In the United Kingdom there is a national, officially recognised Press Card, it is issued by the UK Press Card Authority (UKPCA), which is an organisation owned and controlled by the UK’s major media organisations, industry associations, trades unions, and professional associations. It is the only card issued in the UK to be recognised by the police, other emergency services and government departments.

Fake cards
Genuine press cards can be obtained by people not entitled to them, counterfeit copies of real cards can be made, and plausible-looking cards can be issued by anybody, or made. The reasons and consequences range from the trivial (free drinks) to the catastrophic (access by terrorists to heads of states or other important officials).

Spurious cards
Press passes not issued by a recognised publication can be obtained or made, with the intention of gaining benefits offered to holders of legitimate press cards. Joan Stewart of the Public Relations Society of America reports, “Fake press passes abound at restaurant and theater openings, sporting events, music festivals, political rallies, celebrity parties and even crime scenes. With a decent computer and color printer, almost anybody can crank out an official-looking pass within minutes.”

Counterfeit cards
Counterfeit copies of cards issued by legitimate publications can be made. Issuers of cards have taken measures to prevent counterfeiting of their cards, creating cards with holographic foil blocking, signature strips, and tamper-resistant lamination.

References

External links
The French Press card committee's website, ccijp.net
UK Press Card Authority, ukpresscardauthority.co.uk

Journalism
Business documents